Dinsdale Morgan (born November 19, 1972) is a Jamaican athlete who competes in the 400-m hurdles.

His personal best time is 48.13 seconds, achieved in Rome in 1998.

Morgan met his wife, Jeanetta Lyle-Morgan, at Pittsburg State University. They have three children: Dinsdale Morgan Jr., JaMichael, and Jakaila Morgan. Dinsdale Jr. recently completed his collegiate career at the University of Kansas. JaMicheal is a professional basketball player in Kosovo.

Achievements
Dinsdale earned honor of Jamaica’s Track and field Athlete and Sportsman of Year in 1999.

References

External links

Olympedia profile for Dinsdale Morgan
2020 Hall of Fame induction of Pittsburg State All-America sprinter/hurdler Dinsdale Morgan
Morgan Named to USTFCCCA Hall of Fame & NCAA DII Athlete Hall of Fame, Class of 2020
Blue Valley Southwest High School Track and Field coach in Overland Park, Kansas and St. Elizabeth Technical High School alumnus teaches and coaches
2013 Kansas City Kansas Community College Hall of Fame induction of All-America sprinter/hurdler Dinsdale Morgan

1972 births
Living people
Jamaican male hurdlers
Athletes (track and field) at the 1996 Summer Olympics
Athletes (track and field) at the 2000 Summer Olympics
Olympic athletes of Jamaica
Athletes (track and field) at the 1998 Commonwealth Games
Athletes (track and field) at the 2002 Commonwealth Games
Commonwealth Games medallists in athletics
Commonwealth Games gold medallists for Jamaica
Competitors at the 1998 Central American and Caribbean Games
Central American and Caribbean Games gold medalists for Jamaica
Pittsburg State Gorillas athletes
World Athletics Indoor Championships medalists
Central American and Caribbean Games medalists in athletics
Medallists at the 1998 Commonwealth Games